Red Bird City Hall functioned as the center of local government in the all-black town of Red Bird. In 1932, the town decided to build a city hall which was completed in 1933. The building was listed on the National Register of Historic Places September 28, 1984.

Notes

City and town halls on the National Register of Historic Places in Oklahoma
Buildings and structures in Wagoner County, Oklahoma
City halls in Oklahoma
African-American history of Oklahoma
National Register of Historic Places in Wagoner County, Oklahoma
Government buildings completed in 1933
1933 establishments in Oklahoma